Samuel Kwadwo Asiamah is a former Ghanaian Supreme Court Judge.

Asiamah initially studied for an Education career, obtaining the Teacher's Certificate 'A' and Specialist Certificate in English. He proceeded to complete a Bachelor of Laws degree and subsequently became a barrister.

Asiamah was enrolled on the Ghana Bar in 1978. He was appointed to the Supreme Court of Ghana by John Kufuor in his capacity as the President of Ghana in March 2006. He was sworn in together with Sophia Adinyira on the same day. During his vetting, Asiamah made it clear that he was against capital punishment.

See also
List of judges of the Supreme Court of Ghana
Judiciary of Ghana

References

1938 births
Living people
Justices of the Supreme Court of Ghana
20th-century Ghanaian judges
21st-century Ghanaian judges